North face or Northface or The North Face may refer to:
 North face (Eiger), in the Bernese Alps in Switzerland
 North Face (Everest), in Himalaya, usually traversed ascending Everest from the north
 North face (Fairview Dome), a climbing route in Yosemite National Park, US
 North face (Grand Teton), a climbing route in Wyoming, US
 North face (Grandes Jorasses), in the Mont Blanc massif
 North Face (film), 2008 German historical fiction film
 Northface University, in Utah, US
 Northface (horse), a Canadian Thoroughbred
 "Northface", a song from the album T2: Kontrakultur by Timbuktu
 The North Face, an American outdoor product company
 The North Face (novel), by Mary Renault

See also
 Great north faces of the Alps
 North Wall (disambiguation)